The 2011 Sony Ericsson Open (also known as 2011 Miami Masters), a men's and women's tennis tournament, was held from March 22 to April 3, 2011. It was the 27th edition of the Miami Masters event and played on outdoor hard courts at the Tennis Center at Crandon Park in Miami. The tournament was a part of 2011 ATP World Tour and 2011 WTA Tour, classified as ATP World Tour Masters 1000 and Premier Mandatory event respectively.

Tournament

The 2011 Sony Ericsson Open took place at the Tennis Center at Crandon Park in Miami. This was the twenty seventh edition of the event and took place from March 22 to April 3, 2011. The tournament was part of the 2011 ATP World Tour and the 2011 WTA Tour. It was a Masters 1000 series event on the ATP Tour and a Premier Mandatory series event on the WTA Tour. It was the second event to be staged in 2011 in either category. The tournament was played on 12 Laykold Cushion Plus courts which have been rated slow by the ITF.

Points and prize money

Point distribution

Prize money
The total commitment prize money for this year's event was $4,500,000 each (WTA Tour and ATP World Tour).

Players

Men's singles

Seeds

 Rankings are as of March 21, 2011.

Other entrants
The following players received wildcards into the main draw:
 James Blake
 Ryan Harrison
 Ivo Karlović
 Jack Sock
 Bernard Tomic

The following player received entry using a protected ranking into the main draw:
 Juan Martín del Potro

The following players received entry from the qualifying draw:

 Alex Bogomolov Jr.
 Paul Capdeville
 Grigor Dimitrov
 Marsel İlhan
 Robert Kendrick
 Igor Kunitsyn
 Paolo Lorenzi
 Olivier Rochus
 Michael Russell
 Rainer Schüttler
 Ryan Sweeting
 Donald Young

Withdrawals
  Thiemo de Bakker (wisdom teeth) → replaced by  Milos Raonic
  Juan Carlos Ferrero → replaced by  Rubén Ramírez Hidalgo
  Tommy Haas → replaced by  Blaž Kavčič
  Lleyton Hewitt (foot surgery recovery) → replaced by  Frederico Gil
  Gaël Monfils (left wrist) → replaced by  Mischa Zverev
  David Nalbandian (torn hamstring & hernia) → replaced by  Ricardo Mello
  Tommy Robredo (adductor injury) → replaced by  Somdev Devvarman

Women's singles

Seeds

 Rankings are as of March 7, 2011.

Other entrants
The following players received wildcards into the main draw:
 Sorana Cîrstea
 Sabine Lisicki
 Madison Keys
 Dinara Safina
 Coco Vandeweghe
 Heather Watson
 Petra Martić
 Ajla Tomljanović

The following players received entry using a protected ranking into the main draw:
 Melinda Czink
 Urszula Radwańska

The following players received entry from the qualifying draw:

 Chan Yung-jan
 Jelena Dokić
 Jamie Hampton
 Lucie Hradecká
 Vesna Manasieva
 Sania Mirza
 Ksenia Pervak
 Arantxa Rus
 Sloane Stephens
 Anna Tatishvili
 Anastasiya Yakimova
 Zhang Shuai

Withdrawals
  Akgul Amanmuradova → replaced by  Virginie Razzano
  Alona Bondarenko → replaced by  Urszula Radwańska
  Anna Chakvetadze → replaced by  Sybille Bammer
  Romina Oprandi → replaced by  Anabel Medina Garrigues
  Anastasija Sevastova → replaced by  Kristina Barrois
  Carla Suárez Navarro → replaced by  Chanelle Scheepers
  Tamarine Tanasugarn → replaced by  Zuzana Ondrášková
  Serena Williams (pulmonary embolism and related upcoming surgery) → replaced by  Edina Gallovits-Hall
  Venus Williams (abdominal injury) → replaced by  Lourdes Domínguez Lino

Finals

Men's singles

 Novak Djokovic defeated  Rafael Nadal, 4–6, 6–3, 7–6(7–4)
It was Djokovic's 4th title of the year and 22nd of his career. It was his 2nd Masters of the year and 7th of his career. It was his 2nd win at Miami, also winning in 2007. The win brought Djokovic to 26 consecutive match wins dating to the 2010 Davis Cup final.

Women's singles

 Victoria Azarenka defeated  Maria Sharapova, 6–1, 6–4
It was Azarenka's 1st title of the year and 6th of her career. It was her 4th career Premier win and 2nd at the Mandatory level. It was her 2nd win at Miami, also winning in 2009.

Men's doubles

 Mahesh Bhupathi /  Leander Paes defeated  Max Mirnyi /  Daniel Nestor, 6–7(5–7), 6–2, [10–5]

Women's doubles

 Daniela Hantuchová /  Agnieszka Radwańska defeated  Liezel Huber /  Nadia Petrova, 7–6(7–5), 2–6, [10–8]

Viewership

Attendance
A record capacity of 14,625 crowd attended the men's final on Sunday, April 3. Also the tournament attracted a new record sum of 316,267 spectators breaking the previous one of 312,386 sold tickets set last year.

References

External links
 Official website

 
Sony Ericsson Open
Sony Ericsson Open
Sony Ericsson Open
Miami Open (tennis)
Sony Ericsson